The BMW M73 is a naturally-aspirated, SOHC, V12 petrol engine which replaced the BMW M70 and was produced from 1993 to 2002. It was used in the BMW E38 7 Series, E31 8 Series and Rolls-Royce Silver Seraph.

Design
While most other engines in the BMW range had switched to dual overhead camshafts with four valves per cylinder, the M73 used a single overhead camshaft and with two valves per cylinder. However, this 48-valve engine did not fulfill the comfort demands of the large sedan class in all respects and, as a result, did not go into production.

Some versions of the engine have two separate Bosch Motronic engine control units, while others use a single Siemens ECU.

The hydrogen versions of the engine feature a  lean burn concept, which allows quality torque control similar to a Diesel engine (i. e. no engine throttling). Due to the lower LHV of a hydrogen-air mixture, and the fact that the engine was designed as a Bi-Fuel (petrol and hydrogen) engine, the power output is reduced by 38 per cent compared to the petrol only version of the engine.

Models

M73B54
Applications:
 1994-1998 E38 750i/750iL/L7
 1994-1999 E31 850Ci

M73TUB54
Due to more stringent emissions standards, the 1999 model year marked the addition of an electronically heated catalyst, variable MAP thermostat, and water cooled alternator.

Applications:
 1998-2001 E38 750i/750iL/L7/hL
 1998 Cardi Curara
 1999-2002 Rolls-Royce Silver Seraph
 2009–2010 Symbol Design Lavazza GTX
 2013 Monte Carlo Automobile Rascasse

M72B54 prototype
In 1989, as part of a feasibility study, BMW's engine development department produced a four-valve version of its V12 engine. Only one engine was produced, having an up-sized variant of the M70B50 engine called the M72B54. Bore and stroke was increased to 85mm and 79mm and the total displacement of 5.4L was achieved, matching the values of the standard M73 engine.

Awards 
 1999 International Engine of the Year - Best Above 4.0 Litre category winner

References

See also
 List of BMW engines

M73
V12 engines
Gasoline engines by model